Lorch (Württ) station is a railway station in the municipality of Lorch, located in the Ostalbkreis district in Baden-Württemberg, Germany. The station lies on the Rems Railway. The train services are operated by Go-Ahead Baden-Württemberg.

References 

Railway stations in Baden-Württemberg
Buildings and structures in Ostalbkreis